Nick Halkes (born Nigel Halkes) is a UK based music industry executive best known for signing a breaking dance act the Prodigy and being one of the founders of the XL Recordings label. He is now an artist manager and music publisher managing Liam Howlett (the Prodigy), Bad Company UK and more. Halkes previously managed Grammy nominated Engine-EarZ Experiment, DJ Fresh and Stanton Warriors. Over recent years as a manager Halkes has also worked with DJ René LaVice. He is also a part time lecturer on the music industry at the prestigious University of Westminster. Currently he does guest lectures at a variety of UK educational institutions including Institute of Contemporary Music Performance (London), London College of Creative Media (London), Confetti Institute of Creative Technologies (Nottingham), Tileyard Education (London), Notting Hill Academy of Music (London), Birmingham City University, Point Blank (London), BIMM (Brighton and Bristol) and more. He runs the Reach Up club night and radio show with a partner Andy Smith, Crissy Kybosh is no longer involved in Reach Up. As DJ/producer "Nick Reach Up" he has officially remixed Kylie single Magic, Mel C, Degrees of Motion, Xpansions - "Move Your Body" and many more. Nick has played multiple festivals including Bestival, Shindig, Eastern Electrics, Beautiful Days, Bluedot and more.

Career
Along with Richard Russell, he formed early rave duo Kicks Like a Mule, enjoying chart success in 1992 with their debut single, "The Bouncer". This track was covered by fledgling new-rave outfit Klaxons in 2006.

Halkes has enjoyed major A&R success with the Prodigy in recent years with the album Invaders Must Die on which he co-wrote the title track and the subsequent album The Day Is My Enemy on which he co-wrote three tracks.

Halkes was one of the founders of independent record label XL Recordings where he signed and worked with acts such as House of Pain, SL2 and Liquid before taking up a position as a director at EMI and launching the Positiva label (developed that label into a powerhouse imprint), then later the Incentive label. The Positiva label enjoyed significant success under Halkes' leadership with artists such as Reel 2 Real, Alice Deejay, the Bucketheads and more and is now home to David Guetta and Deadmau5, amongst others.

Halkes has a track record for signing and developing dance and electronic talent that stretches across three decades. Halkes has also overseen the careers of developing artists Catchment, One Bit and Engine-EarZ Experiment. He records sporadically under the Horx moniker. 

Amongst the publishing signings to Halkes’ JV with Sentric Music Group are northern writer and producer team PBH & JACK. They are the first to sign an exclusive songwriting agreement as a result of the partnership. Irish artist, producer/DJ Elaine Mai who was nominated for the song of the year and the album of the year 2021 in the RTÉ Choice Music Prize in Ireland, has signed an exclusive publishing deal with Nick Halkes and his joint venture with Sentric Music Group. 

Nick co-produces and co-hosts a successful podcast series called Trailblazers: Electronic Pioneers podcast with Eddy Temple-Morris - where they are now on their 4th season.

References 

British music industry executives
Living people
A&R people
English electronic musicians
English record producers
Year of birth missing (living people)